Horace Howard Furness High School is a secondary (9th-12th) school in South Philadelphia. It is part of the School District of Philadelphia.

Portions of South Philadelphia (including Bella Vista, Passyunk Square, Pennsport, Queen Village, and Whitman) are zoned to Furness. A section of Center City, including Society Hill and Old City, was formerly zoned to Furness for high school.

History
It was originally built as an elementary school, with construction starting in 1913 and ending in 1914; it later became Horace Furness Junior High School. It was named for Shakespearean scholar Horace Howard Furness (1833-1912).

It was added to the National Register of Historic Places as Horace Furness Junior High School in 1986. It was later converted into a senior high school, and its first high school graduation was held in 1991.

In 2012 Daniel Peou, a Cambodian American man who was once a refugee and had lived in Philadelphia, became the principal of Furness.

Architecture
The school building was designed by Henry deCourcy Richards and built by Cramp & Co. It is a four-story, rectangular, reinforced concrete building clad in brick and terra cotta in the Late Gothic Revival-style. It features an oversized arched entryway, blind panels, terra cotta quoining, and a brick parapet.

Student body
 the school had 694 students. These students used over 25 different languages.

In 2000 the school had about 1,200 students. In the 2009-2010 school year the school had 673 students, with 40% being African-American and 38% being Asian.

Benjamin Herold of the Philadelphia Public School Notebook stated that Furness was largely free of racial tensions.

Academic performance
In regards to Pennsylvania's state achievement tests, of 11th graders at Furness, the percentages of students meeting the standard or higher were 43% in reading and 58% in mathematics. In terms of Philadelphia's comprehensive schools these percentages were higher than the average.

Transportation
SEPTA routes 29, 57 and 79 serve Furness.

School uniforms
Furness requires its students to wear school uniforms. Students may wear a gray shirt that must have a collar on it with black pants.

Feeder patterns
K-8 schools feeding into Furness include:
 Andrew Jackson School
 Eliza Butler Kirkbride School
 William M. Meredith School
 George W. Nebinger School
 George Sharswood School
 John H. Taggart School
 Vare-Washington School (formerly Abigail Vare School and George Washington School)

Previously George A. McCall School in Society Hill fed Furness High.

See also

Horace Howard Furness

References

External links

 
  - 2017
  - 2001-2007
  - 1997-2002

School buildings on the National Register of Historic Places in Philadelphia
Gothic Revival architecture in Pennsylvania
School buildings completed in 1914
High schools in Philadelphia
School District of Philadelphia
Public high schools in Pennsylvania
1914 establishments in Pennsylvania
South Philadelphia